Arthur Wigglesworth (26 October 1891 − 15 June 1974) was an English footballer who played as a defender.

Born in Sculcoates a suburb of Hull, he played for Hull City before joining Doncaster Rovers for the 1920–21 season in the Midland League. His debut was as captain against Rotherham Town. He played 202 games for Doncaster in all competitions before moving to Goole Town in 1925.

He died in 1974 in Hull.

References

1891 births
1974 deaths
People from Sculcoates
Footballers from Kingston upon Hull
English footballers
Association football defenders
Hull City A.F.C. players
Doncaster Rovers F.C. players
Goole Town F.C. players
English Football League players
Midland Football League players